Strioderes peruanus is a species of beetle in the family Cerambycidae, and the only species in the genus Strioderes. It was described by Giorgi in 2001.

References

Onciderini
Beetles described in 2001